Bahçe is a rural district and town of Osmaniye Province in the Mediterranean region of Turkey. It is located in the Nur Mountains area.

The Bahçe Wind Farm, situated on the Gökçedağ, was the country's largest one with its installed power of 135 MW as it was commissioned in 2009.

The Ayran railroad station (Ayran İstasyonu) is located east of the town, near the entrance to the tunnel (Bahçe-tünel) leading to Fevzipaşa. This tunnel was originally built as part of the Baghdad Railway in the early 20th century.

Notable natives
 Devlet Bahçeli, politician and chairman of the Nationalist Movement Party (MHP)

References

External links
 District governor's official website 
 District municipality's official website 

Populated places in Osmaniye Province
 
Towns in Turkey